Steve Bossé (born July 29, 1981) is a Canadian professional boxer currently competing in the heavyweight division. Bossé is a former mixed martial artist in the Light Heavyweight division of the UFC and was also known as an infamous hockey enforcer "The Boss" in the Quebec semi-professional league Ligue Nord-Américaine de Hockey Bossé was one of the most popular players amongst the Quebec fans.

Early life 
Bossé played hockey as a child and his goal was to become a professional in that sport.  Always a tough player, he would train in boxing in order to improve his effectiveness on the ice.  Bossé was a successful hockey enforcer in the Quebec semi-professional league of Ligue Nord-Américaine de Hockey (North American Hockey League) (LNAH).

Mixed martial arts career
Bossé began his training in mixed martial arts with Mark Colangelo, a purple belt in Brazilian jiu-jitsu under Renzo Gracie, and with Stephane Dube, a popular martial artist in Quebec.  Bossé became interested in MMA in 2006 after he met his agent Stephane Patry, who gave him his first opportunity to fight.  Bossé made his professional debut in the organization TKO June 1st, 2007 at the Montreal Bell Centre against David Fraser.

Strike Box/Titans Fighting incident 
On February 6, 2009, Bossé fought James Thompson at Strike Box/Titans Fighting's inaugural event in Quebec, Canada. The event was originally scheduled to be conducted under Strike Box's own rules where only boxing, takedowns and standing submissions were allowed, but the rules were not accepted by the province's athletic commission in time for the event. It was therefore instead conducted under MMA rules. Before the event some fighters agreed to fight under Strike Box's proposed rules as a gentleman's agreement, though the referee in charge would not have any choice but to allow ground fighting were it to happen. Thompson, who later claimed to be unaware of the agreement, proceed to take down, mount and ground and pound Bossé - as allowed under MMA rules - after Bossé went for a standing guillotine choke at the start of the fight. This caused the attending audience to boo Thompson and the referee, unaware of that the fight was technically conducted under MMA rules. Beer cans and eventually chairs were then thrown into the ring, prompting referee Yves Lavigne to stop the match declaring it a no contest.

Ultimate Fighting Championship
Bossé was expected to make his promotional debut against Ryan Jimmo on April 16, 2014 at The Ultimate Fighter Nations Finale. However, Bossé was forced to pull out of the bout citing an injury. He was replaced by Sean O'Connell.

Bossé faced Thiago Santos on June 27, 2015 at UFC Fight Night 70. He lost the fight by knockout in the first round.

Bossé faced James Te Huna on March 20, 2016 at UFC Fight Night 85. He won the fight via KO in the first round.

Bossé next faced Sean O'Connell on June 18, 2016 at UFC Fight Night 89. Bossé was awarded a unanimous decision victory. The back and forth action earned both participants Fight of the Night honors.

Bossé was expected to face Jared Cannonier on July 7, 2017 at The Ultimate Fighter 25 Finale. However, Bossé was removed from the fight just days before the event and was replaced by promotional newcomer Nick Roehrick.

Bossé later announced that he would pursue a boxing career, and has not fought in mixed martial arts since.

Professional boxing career

Bossé vs. Cuellar Cabrera

Steve “The Boss” Bossé made his professional boxing debut as part of the third installment of the 2017-2018 “CHRONO AVIATION Boxing Series 2017-2018”, February 15th at the Cabaret du Casino de Montréal. Bossé faced the Bolivian heavyweight Julio “Conceali” Cuellar Cabrera (12-6-0, 11 KOs), in a six-round bout.   Bossé won via second-round KO.

Hockey record

GP = Games played; G = Goals; A = Assists; Pts = Points; PIM = Penalty minutes;

Hockey awards 
Ligue Nord-Américaine de Hockey
 2003-2004: Championship with the Dragons de Verdun
 2006-2007: Championship with the Summum-Chiefs de Saint-Jean-sur-Richelieu

Mixed martial arts record  

|-
|Win
|align=center|12–2 (1)
|Sean O'Connell
|Decision (unanimous)
|UFC Fight Night: MacDonald vs. Thompson
|
|align=center|3
|align=center|5:00
|Ottawa, Ontario, Canada
|
|-
|Win
|align="center"|11–2 (1)
|James Te Huna
|KO (punch)
|UFC Fight Night: Hunt vs. Mir
|
|align="center"|1
|align="center"|0:52
|Brisbane, Australia
|
|-
|Loss
|align="center"|10–2 (1)
|Thiago Santos
|KO (head kick)
|UFC Fight Night: Machida vs. Romero
|
|align="center"|1
|align="center"|0:29
|Hollywood, Florida, United States
|
|-
|Win
|align="center"|10–1 (1)
|Caleb Grummet
|TKO (doctor stoppage)
|Challenge MMA 1
|
|align="center"|1
|align="center"|5:00
|Richelieu, Quebec, Canada
|
|-
|Win
|align="center"|9–1 (1)
|Houston Alexander
|KO (elbow)
|Instinct MMA 1
|
|align="center"|2
|align="center"|4:11
|Boisbriand, Quebec, Canada
|
|-
|Win
|align="center"|8–1 (1)
|Mychal Clark
|TKO (punches)
|W-1 MMA 5: Judgment Day
|
|align="center"|1
|align="center"|4:29
|Montreal, Quebec, Canada
|
|-
|Win
|align="center"|7–1 (1)
|Marvin Eastman
|Decision (unanimous)
|MFL 2: Battleground
|
|align="center"|3
|align="center"|5:00
|Montreal, Quebec, Canada
|
|-
|Win
|align="center"|6–1 (1)
|Craig Brown
|TKO (punches)
|Ringside MMA 3: Battle for the Belt
|
|align="center"|1
|align="center"|2:45
|Montreal, Quebec, Canada
|
|-
|Win
|align="center"|5–1 (1)
|Yan Pellerin
|TKO (punches)
|Ringside MMA 1: The Comeback
|
|align="center"|1
|align="center"|0:45
|Montreal, Quebec, Canada
|
|-
|NC
|align="center"|4–1 (1)
|
|No Contest
|Titans Fighting
|
|align="center"|N/A
|align="center"|N/A
|Montreal, Quebec, Canada
|
|-
|Win
|align="center"|4–1
|Sebastien Gauthier
|TKO (punches)
|TKO 35: Quenneville vs. Hioki
|
|align="center"|1
|align="center"|3:59
|Montreal, Quebec, Canada
|
|-
|Win
|align="center"|3–1
|Wes Sims
|Submission (toe hold)
|TKO 34: Sims vs. Bossé
|
|align="center"|1
|align="center"|3:05
|Montreal, Quebec, Canada
|
|-
|Loss
|align="center"|2–1
|Icho Larenas
|TKO (punches)
|TKO 31: Young Guns
|
|align="center"|3
|align="center"|3:31
|Montreal, Quebec, Canada
|
|-
|Win
|align="center"|2–0
|Jody Burke
|TKO (punches)
|TKO 30: Apocalypse
|
|align="center"|1
|align="center"|1:20
|Montreal, Quebec, Canada
|
|-
|Win
|align="center"|1–0
|David Fraser
|TKO (punches)
|TKO 29: Repercussion
|
|align="center"|1
|align="center"|2:02
|Montreal, Quebec, Canada
|
|-
|}

Professional boxing record

See also
 List of current UFC fighters
 List of Canadian UFC fighters
 List of male mixed martial artists

References

External links
 
 

Canadian male mixed martial artists
1981 births
Verdun Dragons players
Living people
Ultimate Fighting Championship male fighters
Canadian male boxers